Pedro Ricardo López (Valle del Cauca, 1912 - 17 June 2006) was a Colombian football defender and manager. He competed for the Colombia national football team at the 1938 Bolivarian Games and 1945 South American Championship.

References

1912 births
2006 deaths
Colombian footballers
Colombia international footballers
Deportivo Pasto footballers
Association football defenders
Colombian football managers
Colombia national football team managers
Sportspeople from Valle del Cauca Department